A citation is a credit or reference to another document or source.

Citation may also refer to:

Government, law, and military
 Citation (police), a type of summons compelling the appearance of a defendant before the local magistrate
 Traffic citation, a notice issued to a motorist accusing violation of traffic laws
 Case citation, the system used in common law countries to uniquely identify the location of past court cases
 Legal citation, the style of crediting and referencing other documents or sources of authority in legal writing
 Unit citation, a formal, honorary mention of a military unit's outstanding performance
 Law of Citations, a Roman law issued from Ravenna in AD 426
 Citation Star, a US Department of War personal valor decoration

Transportation
 Chevrolet Citation, an automobile
 Edsel Citation, an automobile
 Cessna Citation, a series of business jets produced by Cessna Aircraft Company
 Citation Boulevard, a four-lane divided highway in Lexington, Kentucky

Other uses
 Citation (film), a Nigerian film
 Citation (album), a 2006 album by Scott Miller
 Citation (horse) (1945–1970), a Thoroughbred champion race horse
 Gibson Citation, a guitar
 Citation Race Cars, an automobile manufacturer involved in US Formula 1000 Championship racing

See also
 Cite (disambiguation)
 CIT (disambiguation)
 Citation index, a bibliographic database indexing citations between publications